Erik Werba (23 May 1918 – 9 April 1992) was an Austrian classical pianist who is especially known as an accompanist of singers. He was also a music critic, conductor, composer, author and academic teacher.

Career 
Werba was born in Baden bei Wien, the son of Ludwig Werba (1884–1945), who was born in Graz and became a composer, music director and vice-president of the Österreichisch-ungarischer Musikerverband, founded in 1896. Ludwig Werba died in a bombing raid on 2 April 1945.

Werba completed the Matura at the Baden Gymnasium in 1936. He then studied at both the Akademie für Musik und darstellende Kunst in Vienna and the University of Vienna, where he earned a PhD in 1940. He worked as a music critic and teacher, and directed the Mozartgemeinde after World War II. As a pianist, he focused on accompanying lieder singers. He collaborated with Irmgard Seefried, Christa Ludwig, Walter Berry, Kim Borg, Brigitte Fassbaender, Peter Schreier and Nicolai Gedda, appearing internationally.

Werba was a professor of lied and oratorio at the Wiener Musikakademie from 1949 to 1990, and from 1964 to 1971 also at the Akademie für Musik und darstellende Kunst in Graz. As a journalist, he worked for the newsletters of the Mozartgemeinde, the Wiener Figaro, the Österreichische Musikzeitschrift and the periodical Musikerziehung. As a composer, he wrote incidental music, chamber music and lieder.

Werba died on 9 April 1992 in Hinterbrühl. He is buried at the Maria Enzersdorf cemetery.

Compositions 
Werba composed lieder, including:
 "Ich bin...", for high voice and piano (1936)
 "Neige dein Köpfchen", for high voice and piano (1936)
 "Ich saß vor dunklem Walde", for high voice and piano (1936)

Publications 
 Richard Strauss zum 85. Geburtstag, 1949
 Tenoralbum, 1951
 Bariton-Baß-Album, 1953
 Josef Marx, eine Studie, 1962
 Hugo Wolf oder – Der zornige Romantiker, 1971
 Erich Marckhl, 1972
 Hugo Wolf und seine Lieder, 1984

Awards 
 1960: Mozartmedaille awarded by the Mozart Society of Vienna

References

External links 
 
 Erik Werba im Austria-Forum
 

1918 births
1992 deaths
Musicians from Baden bei Wien
Austrian composers
Austrian classical pianists
Male classical pianists
Austrian music critics
Classical accompanists
20th-century classical composers
University of Vienna alumni
Academic staff of the University of Vienna
20th-century male musicians